Best Of is the second compilation album by the Mexican pop band RBD, released in September 2008 in Mexico and in October 2008 on South America and United States. The album compiles all of the singles included in the group's first five studio albums, Rebelde (2004), Nuestro Amor (2005), Celestial (2006), Rebels (2006) and Empezar desde Cero (2007), plus a studio version from "No Pares", a track released on their Live In Hollywood album (2006). The Album was certified Golden in Serbia and Ecuador.

The only singles not included on the album are "México, México", "Dame", "Wanna Play", "Money Money" and "Y No Puedo Olvidarte".

Best Of RBD

Track listings
CD
"Rebelde" (DJ Kafka, Max Di Carlo) — 3:32
"Sólo Quédate en Silencio" (Mauricio Arriaga) — 3:37
"Un Poco de tu Amor" (DJ Kafka, Max Di Carlo) — 3:24
"Sálvame" (DJ Kafka, Max Di Carlo, Pedro Damián) — 3:43
"No Pares" (Studio version) (Lynda, Carlos Lara) — 3:47
"Nuestro Amor" (Memo Méndez Guiu, Emil "Billy" Méndez) — 3:33
"Aún Hay Algo" (Carlos Lara, Karen Sokoloff) — 3:34
"Este Corazón" (Armando Ávila) — 3:29
"Tras De Mí" (Carlos Lara, Karen Sokoloff, Pedro Damián) — 3:11
"Tu Amor" (Diane Warren) — 4:37
"Ser o Parecer" (Armando Ávila) — 3:31
"Celestial" (Carlos Lara, Pedro Damián) — 3:28
"Bésame Sin Miedo (Kiss Me Like You Mean It)" (Chico Bennett, John Ingoldsby) — 3:32
"Inalcanzable" (Carlos Lara) — 4:14
"Empezar desde Cero" (Ávila) — 3:16

Best Of RBD: (Incluye todos los videos de RBD)

The regular version released by EMI includes a DVD with the group's music videos. In Brazil, the DVD was released separately.

The DVD "Best Of RBD" is a version of the CD "Best Of RBD," which contains all the video clips that the group produced during their four years of career.

The DVD does not contain the latest video clip of the group, entitled, "Para Olvidarte De Mí", which was launched a few months after the launch of the DVD.

"Rebelde"
"Sólo Quédate en Silencio"
"Sálvame"
"No Pares" (Live video)
"Nuestro Amor"
"Aún Hay Algo"
"Tu Amor"
"Ser o Parecer"
"Celestial"
"Bésame Sin Miedo"
"Inalcanzable"
"Empezar desde Cero

Charts and certifications

Charts

Certifications

Release history

Hits Em Português

Hits in Portuguese is a collection of Portuguese in the successes of RBD launched on October 22, 2008, such as "Rebelde", "Fique em silêncio", "Salva-me", "Nosso amor", "Venha de novo o amor, "Ser ou parecer", "Celestial", and "Beija-me sem medo".
End a Portuguese version, Hits em Português is set for an October 22, 2008 release. The album does not feature any new tracks, therefore there won't be any official singles taken from it.
Track listing
Salva-me (Version by Claudio Rabello)
Ser ou Parecer (Version by Claudio Rabello)
Celestial (Version by Claudio Rabello)
Beija-me Sem Medo (Version by Claudio Rabello)
Rebelde (Version by Claudio Rabello)
Esse Coração (Version by Claudio Rabello)
Ao seu Lado (Version by Claudio Rabello)
Ensina-me (Version by Claudio Rabello)
Nosso Amor (Version by Claudio Rabello)
Fique em Silêncio (Version by Claudio Rabello)
O que Há Por Trás (Version by Claudio Rabello)
Talvez Depois (Version by Claudio Rabello)
Querer-te (Version by Claudio Rabello)
Um Pouco Desse Amor (Version by Claudio Rabello)
Venha de Novo o Amor (Version by Claudio Rabello)

Greatest Hits

Greatest Hits is the American version of Best Of. Greatest Hits is RBD's first compilation album released in the United States. The compilation was released on November 25, 2008, in CD and DVD formats. Greatest Hits looks back on the major hits that RBD achieved all around the world during their first four years as an international pop sensation. The compilation has different content for the United States public that differs from the content in Best Of and its Brazilian counterpart Hits Em Português. Among those differences are the inclusion of the song "Estar Bien", featuring Chilean pop group Kudai and Mexican singer Eiza "Lola" González, a karaoke track, a historical photo gallery, and that, contrary to its counterparts, which both boasted 15 tracks each, the album only includes 11 of RBD's greatest hits. The compilation's accompanying DVD contains the music videos for the songs present in the CD, plus karaoke and the making of the video for "Empezar Desde Cero".

The compilation album peaked at #37 on the US Billboard Top Latin Albums chart and reached #9 on the Billboard Latin Pop Albums ranking.

Track listing

 Notes
"Tu Amor" was originally recorded by American singer Jon B. on his album Cool Relax (1997).
  signifies a co-producer

Greatest Hits DVD

The Greatest Hits DVD contains 11 of RBD's music videos, spanning the four years that marked the group's impressive musical history. The DVD also contains the karaoke version of "Inalcanzable" and the making of the video for "Empezar Desde Cero".

Track listing
"Rebelde"
"Solo Quédate en Silencio"
"Sálvame"
"Nuestro Amor"
"Aún Hay Algo"
"Este Corazón"
"Tu Amor"
"Ser o Parecer"
"Celestial"
"Inalcanzable"
"Empezar Desde Cero"
Bonus material
 "Inalcanzable" (Karaoke)
 "Empezar Desde Cero" (Making-of)

Personnel
Credits adapted from the album and DVD liner notes.

Performance credits
RBD – primary artist, choruses
Kudai – featured vocals, choruses (Greatest Hits CD, track 12)
Lola – featured vocals, choruses (Greatest Hits CD, track 12)

Production
Luis Luisillo Miguel – associate producer
Pedro Damián – executive producer
Televisa En Vivo – management
Armando Ávila – producer
Max di Carlo – producer
Carlos Lara – producer
Carolina Palomo – production coordinator

Charts and certifications

Release history

References

RBD compilation albums
2008 compilation albums